Bhopal–Howrah Express is a weekly express train operated by Indian Railways which runs between Rani Kamlapati railway station in Bhopal, the capital of the Madhya Pradesh state, and Howrah Junction railway station in Kolkata, the capital of the West Bengal state.

Coach composite
The train consists of 16 coaches:

 2 AC II Tier
 4 AC III Tier
 9 sleepers
 2 luggage/generator car
 3 general

Average and Maximum speed
The train runs with an average speed of 54 km/h, and the maximum permissible speed is 130 km/h (between Dankuni Junction and Pradhankhunta Junction).

Time Table

Traction
It is now regularly hauled by Howrah-based WAP-7 end to end throughout the entire journey.

Direction Reversals
The train reverses direction twice at :

Barkakana Junction
Chopan

See also
Bhopal–Damoh Intercity Express
Indore Junction
Bhopal Junction

References

Transport in Bhopal
Express trains in India
Rail transport in Howrah
Railway services introduced in 2003
Rail transport in Madhya Pradesh
Rail transport in Uttar Pradesh
Rail transport in Jharkhand
Rail transport in West Bengal